Intel Ivy Bridge–based Xeon microprocessors (also known as Ivy Bridge-E) is the follow-up to Sandy Bridge-E, using the same CPU core as the Ivy Bridge processor, but in LGA 2011, LGA 1356 and LGA 2011-1 packages for workstations and servers.

There are five different families of Xeon processors that were based on Sandy Bridge architecture:

 Ivy Bridge-E uses LGA 2011 socket and was branded as Core i7 Extreme Edition and Core i7 high-end desktop (HEDT) processors, despite sharing many similarities with Xeon E5 models.
 Ivy Bridge-EP which also uses LGA 2011 socket for the Xeon E5 models aimed at high-end servers and workstations. It supports up to 4 socket motherboards.
 Ivy Bridge-EX introduces new LGA 2011-1 socket and features up to 15 cores. It supports up to eight socket motherboards.
 Ivy Bridge-EN uses a smaller LGA 1356 socket for low-end and dual-processor servers on certain Xeon E5 and Pentium branded models.
 Ivy Bridge Xeon with LGA 1155 socket were mostly identical to its desktop counterparts apart from the missing IGPU despite branded as Xeon processors.
 Gladden was offered in BGA 1284 package for embedded applications.

Features 

Dual memory controllers for Ivy Bridge-EP and Ivy Bridge-EX
 Up to 12 CPU cores and 30 MB of L3 cache for Ivy Bridge-EP
 Up to 15 CPU cores and 37.5 MB L3 cache for Ivy Bridge-EX (released on February 18, 2014 as Xeon E7 v2)
 Thermal design power between 50 W and 155 W
 Support for up to eight DIMMs of DDR3-1866 memory per socket, with reductions in memory speed depending on the number of DIMMs per channel
 No integrated GPU
 Ivy Bridge-EP introduced new hardware support for interrupt virtualization, branded as APICv.

Models and steppings 
The basic Ivy Bridge-E is a single-socket processor sold as Core i7-49xx and is only available in the six-core S1 stepping, with some versions limited to four active cores.

There are in fact three die "flavors" for the Ivy Bridge-EP, meaning that they are manufactured and organized differently, according to the number of cores an Ivy Bridge-EP CPU includes:
 The largest is an up-to-12-core die organized as three four-core columns with up to 30 MB L3 cache in two banks between the cores; these cores are linked by three rings of interconnects.
 The intermediate is an up-to-10-core die organized as two five-core columns with up to 25 MB L3 cache in a single bank between the cores; the cores are linked by two rings of interconnects.
 The smallest is an up-to-six-core die organized as two three-core columns with up to 15 MB L3 cache in a single bank between the cores; the cores are linked by two rings of interconnects.

Ivy Bridge-EX has up to 15 cores and scales to 8 sockets. The 15-core die is organized into three columns of five cores, with three interconnect rings connecting two columns per ring; each five-core column has a separate L3 cache.

Ivy Bridge-E and Ivy Bridge-EP 

 All models support: MMX, SSE, SSE2, SSE3, SSSE3, SSE4.1, SSE4.2, AVX, F16C, Enhanced Intel SpeedStep Technology (EIST), Intel 64, XD bit (an NX bit implementation), TXT, Intel VT-x, Intel EPT, Intel VT-d, Intel VT-c, Intel x8 SDDC, Hyper-threading (except E5-1607 v2, E5-2603 v2, E5-2609 v2 and E5-4627 v2), Turbo Boost (except E5-1607 v2, E5-2603 v2, E5-2609 v2, E5-2618L v2, E5-4603 v2 and E5-4607 v2), AES-NI, Smart Cache.
 Support for up to 12 DIMMs of DDR3 memory per CPU socket.

Ivy Bridge EX 
 All models support: MMX, SSE, SSE2, SSE3, SSSE3, SSE4.1, SSE4.2, AVX, F16C, Enhanced Intel SpeedStep Technology (EIST), Intel 64, XD bit (an NX bit implementation), TXT, Intel VT-x, Intel EPT, Intel VT-d, Intel VT-c, Intel x8 SDDC, Hyper-threading (except E7-8857 v2), Turbo Boost (except E7-4809 v2), AES-NI, Smart Cache.
 Support for up to 24 DIMMs of DDR3 memory per CPU socket.

Ivy Bridge EN 
 All models support: MMX, SSE, SSE2, SSE3, SSSE3, SSE4.1, SSE4.2, AVX, F16C, Enhanced Intel SpeedStep Technology (EIST), Intel 64, XD bit (an NX bit implementation), TXT, Intel VT-x, Intel EPT, Intel VT-d, Intel VT-c, Intel x8 SDDC, Hyper-threading (except E5-2403 v2 and E5-2407 v2), Turbo Boost (except E5-2403 v2, E5-2407 v2 and E5-2418L v2), AES-NI, Smart Cache.
 Support for up to six DIMMs of DDR3 memory per CPU socket.

Ivy Bridge Xeon 
 All models support: MMX, SSE, SSE2, SSE3, SSSE3, SSE4.1, SSE4.2, AVX, F16C, Enhanced Intel SpeedStep Technology (EIST), Intel 64, XD bit (an NX bit implementation), TXT, Intel VT-x, Intel EPT, Intel VT-d, Hyper-threading (except E3-1220 v2 and E3-1225 v2), Turbo Boost, AES-NI, Smart Cache, ECC
 Transistors: E1: 1.4 billion
 Die size: E1: 160 mm²
 All models support uni-processor configurations only.
 Intel HD Graphics P4000 uses drivers that are optimized and certified for professional applications, similar to nVidia Quadro and AMD FirePro products.

Gladden 
 All models support: MMX, Streaming SIMD Extensions (SSE), SSE2, SSE3, SSSE3, SSE4.1, SSE4.2, Advanced Vector Extensions (AVX), Enhanced Intel SpeedStep Technology (EIST), Intel 64, XD bit (an NX bit implementation), Trusted Execution Technology (TXT), Intel VT-x, Intel EPT, Intel VT-d, Hyper-threading, AES-NI.
 All models support uni-processor configurations only.
 Die size:160 mm²
 Steppings: E1

References

Intel microprocessors